Dhankundi is a village in Sherpur Upazila, Bogra District, Bangladesh. It was established about 1750.

See also
 List of villages in Bangladesh

References

Villages in Bogra District
Populated places in Rajshahi District
Villages in Rajshahi Division